Mirta Núñez Díaz-Balart is a Cuban-Spanish  historian.

Life 
Mirta Núñez Díaz-Balart was born into a family marked by history: her father, the lawyer Emilio Núñez Blanco was a notorious anti-Castro activist; her mother, Mirta Díaz-Balart, was the first wife of Fidel Castro. Mirta Núñez was at the same time the sister of the only "official" son of the Cuban president, Fidel Castro Díaz-Balart (1949-2018), and the first cousin of two U.S. Republican congressmen, Lincoln Díaz-Balart, and Mario Díaz-Balart .

Mirta Núñez graduated from Complutense University in 1983, with the thesis "The Press of the International Brigades". In October 1988, she read her doctoral thesis, entitled "The war press in the republican zone during the Spanish Civil War (1936-1939)", directed by José Altabella Hernández . The thesis –6 volumes and 2683 pages, was published four years later. She wrote histories of the Spanish Civil War.

Mirta Núñez is a tenured professor at Complutense University of Madrid.

Works 

 La disciplina de la conciencia: las Brigadas Internacionales, Barcelona, Flor del Viento, 2006, 
 Mujeres caídas: prostitutas legales y clandestinas en el franquismo, prólogo de Rafael Torres, Madrid, Oberon, 2003. 
 Los años del terror; la estrategia de dominio y represión del general Franco, Madrid, La Esfera de los Libros, 2004. 
 La prensa de guerra en la zona republicana durante la Guerra Civil española (1936-1939), Madrid, La Torre, 1992, 3 v. .
 Javier Bueno, un periodista comprometido con la revolución, Madrid, Fundación Banco Exterior, 1987,

References 

Spanish historians
Living people
Year of birth missing (living people)